Derek Sullivan (born 1976) is a contemporary visual artist from Toronto, Ontario. Sullivan’s multidisciplinary practice employs drawing, sculpture, book works, and installation to engage with the legacy of modernist art and design. He is currently an Assistant Professor in Sculpture/Installation at OCAD University.

Art Practice
Sullivan's art practice is characterized by its interdisciplinarity. Of the artist, Canadian Art Magazine writes, "employs drawing, painting, sculpture, book works and installation to question familiar forms and genres, often to examine the links between one discipline and the next."
Books and the act of reading have consistently been central to Sullivan's practice. This interest was apparent in the 2011 exhibition Albatross Omnibus at The Power Plant; where Sullivan hung 52 limited-edition books from one of the gallery's ceilings; and within his limited edition publication, Lynn Valley 8, a series of 40 books co-produced by Bywater Bros. Editions and Presentation House Gallery in 2013  which are only two of the seventy plus Artists Publications Sullivan has produced.

Education
Sullivan graduated from York University with a BFA (1998). He earned his MFA from University of Guelph (2002).

Exhibitions
Sullivan has been the subject of several solo exhibitions including, The Missing Novella at Oakville Galleries in 2015; the 2011 exhibition Albatross Omnibus at The Power Plant;We May be Standing on the Shoulders of Giants but Some of us are Looking at the Stars in 2008 at the Southern Alberta Art Gallery in  Lethbridge Alberta; and in 2005 he presented KIOSK 2005 at the Toronto Sculpture Garden. He has been included in numerous group exhibitions including at the Museum of Contemporary Canadian Art, Toronto; National Gallery of Canada, Ottawa; Contemporary Art Gallery (Vancouver); Casino Luxembourg; Mercer Union, Toronto; Australian Centre for Contemporary Art, Melbourne; and the Swiss Institute, New York.

Awards and recognition
In 2012, Sullivan was a shortlisted for the Sobey Art Award, Canada's largest award for young artists. He was also nominated for the award in 2009, 2011, and 2015.

Collections
 Agnes Etherington Art Centre, Kingston
 Art Gallery of York University, Toronto
 Bibliothèque Kandinsky, Centre Pompidou, Paris 
 Bibliothèque de France, Paris (France)
 CDLA, Saint-Yrieix-la-Perche (France)
 Getty Museum Archives and Library, Los Angeles
 MacDonald-Stewart Art Centre, Guelph
 Library & Archives of the National Gallery of Canada, Ottawa 
 McCarthy-Tétrault, Toronto
 National Gallery of Canada, Ottawa 
 Perimeter Institute, Waterloo 
 University of Waterloo Art Gallery, Waterloo
 Royal Bank of Canada Collection, Toronto 
 Bank of Montreal Collection, Toronto
 TD Canada Trust Bank Group Collection, Toronto
 Private collections (Canada, USA, France, Belgium, Spain)

Further reading 
 Davies, Jon. The Missing Novella, Oakville: Oakville Galleries, 2015
 Hutton, Jen. Bookish in Belgium: Derek Sullivan’s friendly and formal “Young Americans”, Magenta Magazine Online, Summer 2011, Volume 2 No.3
 Neville, Charo. Ideas & Things. Kamloops: Kamloops Art Gallery, 2015
 Twerdy, Saelen. Garden of Forking Paths: A Conversation with Derek Sullivan. C Magazine, Issue 113, Spring 2012. pp. 22-29

References

External links 

Artist Page on Canadian Art online magazine
Artist Page on National Gallery of Canada website
Artists Page from Susan Hobbs Gallery
Artists Page from Tatjana Pieters Gallery
Artists Page from Galerie Antoine Ertaskiran
Artists Page from Galerie Emmanuel Hervé

1976 births
Living people
Canadian multimedia artists
University of Guelph alumni
York University alumni
Artists from Toronto
Place of birth missing (living people)